Hữu Loan (January 14, 1916 – March 18, 2010) was a Vietnamese poet, best known for an autobiographical epic of love and the cruelty of war.

Loan was born in Nga Lĩnh, Nga Sơn District, Thanh Hóa Province, French Vietnam. From 1946 to 1954 he served in Ho Chi Minh's Communist army, and fought against the French. It was when he witnessed the cruelty of the war and later the terror of the Land Reform campaigns by Vietnamese Communists. He wrote his best known work Màu tím hoa sim under the inspirations of the events during the Indochina War. He also wrote some poems criticizing Communist regime for which he was imprisoned in a forced labour camp.

Bibliography 
The Purple Color of Sim Flowers
"Bloody Paradise"  (1991)

References 

Vietnamese Poet Dies (in RFA)

Vietnamese male poets
1916 births
2010 deaths
20th-century Vietnamese poets
20th-century male writers